The BMW Z4 (G29) is a two-door roadster produced by German automobile manufacturer BMW. It was introduced in 2018 as a successor to the E89 Z4. As a fifth model in the lineage, the Z4 (G29) marks the return of the soft-top roof to the Z Series sports cars.

Development and launch 

The G29 Z4 was introduced at the Pebble Beach Concours d’Elegance on August 23, 2018.

Designed by Australian born Calvin Luk, the car is based on the Z4 Concept unveiled a year earlier, and was developed alongside the fifth-generation Toyota Supra due to BMW's partnership with Toyota. The design was inspired by the Z8. The soft-top convertible roof returned on the Z4 (G29) instead of a retractable hardtop of its predecessor. It uses a multi-link rear suspension.

The official launch of the G29 Z4 took place at the 2018 Paris Motor Show in October. The car was available for sale in March 2019.

On March 11, 2022, Magna Steyr halted production of the BMW Z4 (along with the 5-Series) for two weeks due to the lack of components since the ongoing 2022 Russian invasion of Ukraine event. By 2024 the Z4 will end production, being the last Z-car in the BMW Z-series.

Equipment 

The sDrive models are available in a Sport line or the M Sport package. Available driver assistance systems include active cruise control, lane change warning system, a parking assistant, and collision warning with braking intervention.

The Z4 is offered with a 10.25-inch display with the iDrive 7.0. The car is available with BMW ConnectedDrive services which allow for over-the-air updates for the navigation maps and operating system. The digital key feature allows the car to be unlocked and started with a smartphone, and access can be shared with other people. It is also available with a customisable, digital instrument cluster (called BMW Live Cockpit Professional).

Models 
The launch model was the M40i First Edition which has Frozen Orange metallic paintwork and Vernasca leather, 19-inch alloy wheels, adaptive dampers, a Harman Kardon surround sound system and a head-up display.

The Z4 range consists of the sDrive 20i which is only available in Europe, the sDrive 30i and the range topping M40i models. The sDrive models are powered by the 2.0-litre B48 straight-4 engine while the M40i is powered by the B58 straight-6 engine. All engines come with forced induction and are mated to an 8-speed automatic transmission. A 6-speed manual transmission was made available for only the sDrive 20i from July 2019.

Safety 
The 2019 Z4 received five stars overall in its Euro NCAP test.

Awards 
 2019 GQ 'The Sideways Is Best Award'

References

External links 
 

Euro NCAP roadster sports cars
Cars introduced in 2018
Z4 (G29)
G29
2020s cars